The Repeal of Certain Scottish Acts was a repeal of several Acts originating in the Scottish and English parliaments, supplementing the Acts of Union 1707, passed by the Parliament of Great Britain.

The Acts repealed included the Act of Security 1704 and the Act anent Peace and War 1703.

1707 in Scotland
Great Britain Acts of Parliament 1707